Corinth is an unincorporated community in Trumbull County, Ohio, United States.

References

Unincorporated communities in Trumbull County, Ohio
Unincorporated communities in Ohio